Serena Williams defeated Lindsay Davenport in the final, 2–6, 6–3, 6–0 to win the women's singles tennis title at the 2005 Australian Open. It was her second Australian Open singles title and her seventh major singles title overall. Williams saved three match points en route to the title, in the semifinals against Maria Sharapova.

Justine Henin-Hardenne was the reigning champion, but did not compete this year due to a knee injury.

This event marked the first major appearances for future world No. 1 and major champion Ana Ivanovic and two-time major champion Li Na. Both reached the third round before losing to Amélie Mauresmo and Sharapova, respectively.

Seeds

Qualifying

Draw

Finals

Top half

Section 1

Section 2

Section 3

Section 4

Bottom half

Section 5

Section 6

Section 7

Section 8

Other entry information

Wild cards

Qualifiers

Withdrawals

Championship match statistics

External links
 2005 Australian Open – Women's draws and results at the International Tennis Federation

Women's singles
Australian Open (tennis) by year – Women's singles
2005 in Australian women's sport
2005 WTA Tour